The Patriot, or, The Italian Conspiracy is a 1702 tragedy by the English writer Charles Gildon. Based on the life of Cosimo de' Medici but also inspired by Nathaniel Lee's 1680 work Lucius Junius Brutus set during the Roman Republic.

The original Drury Lane cast included John Mills as Cosimo De Medici, Benjamin Husband as Lorenzo, Thomas Simpson as Uberto, Thomas Kent as Donato, Philip Griffin as Rimini, Jane Rogers as Teraminta and Mary Kent as Honoria. The prologue was by John Dennis and the epilogue by George Farquhar. Incidental music was composed by Daniel Purcell.

References

Bibliography
 Burling, William J. A Checklist of New Plays and Entertainments on the London Stage, 1700-1737. Fairleigh Dickinson Univ Press, 1992.
 Nicoll, Allardyce. History of English Drama, 1660-1900, Volume 2. Cambridge University Press, 2009.

1702 plays
English plays
West End plays
Tragedy plays